Ataxia-telangiectasia group D complementing (ATDC) is a gene implicated in ataxia-telangiectasia.

It is involved in a mouse model of pancreatic cancer.

References

Further reading
 
 
 
 
 

Genes associated with cancer